HaBoker (lit. The Morning) was a Hebrew-language daily newspaper in Mandate Palestine and Israel associated with the General Zionists.

History
The paper was established in 1935 by the right-wing of the General Zionists, with the first edition published on 11 October that year. Its first editor, Samuel Perl, left soon after the newspaper's founding, and was replaced by Joseph Heftman and Peretz Bernstein, one of the signatories of the Israeli declaration of independence, who held the post until 1946. Its journalists included Yosef Tamir, a secretary of the General Zionists, and Herzl Vardi, another signatory of the declaration of independence.

The paper's circulation fell following independence, from 13,500 in 1950 to 4,000-4,500 in 1965. In 1965, following the alliance of the Liberal Party (which the General Zionists had become part of in 1961) and Herut, HaBoker was merged with the Herut newspaper to form HaYom, which ceased publication four years later.

See also
Israeli newspapers
Politics of Israel

References

1935 establishments in Mandatory Palestine
1965 disestablishments in Israel
Publications established in 1935
Publications disestablished in 1965
Hebrew-language newspapers
Defunct newspapers published in Israel
Mass media in Tel Aviv
Daily newspapers published in Israel
General Zionism